Pacific Broadcasting System (PBSI) is a radio broadcast company in the Philippines. It is part of the FJE Group of Companies of the Elizalde family, which also operates hotels and Pasay-based amusement park Star City.  Pacific Broadcasting's stations are being operated by Elizalde-owned TV and radio network Manila Broadcasting Company. Most of its AM stations in key provinces are relay stations of DZRH, while its flagship AM station is DXGO, a radio station in Davao City broadcasting as Aksyon Radyo Davao. PBSI's flagship FM station is DWYS 101.1 Manila which also serves as the flagship affiliate station to MBC's Yes The Best Network, with most of its FM stations in the provinces are affiliated with MBC's other FM networks (Love Radio, Easy Rock and Radyo Natin).

See also
List of Manila Broadcasting Company stations#Aksyon Radyo
List of Manila Broadcasting Company stations#Yes The Best
Manila Broadcasting Company
 Aksyon Radyo U.S.

References

 
Mass media companies of the Philippines
Philippine radio networks
Radio stations in the Philippines
Mass media companies established in 1968
Companies based in Pasay
1968 establishments in the Philippines